Boing is an Italian free-to-air television channel marketed at children and teenagers, owned by Boing S.p.A., a joint venture of Fininvest's MFE - MediaForEurope (through its Mediaset Italia subsidiary) and Warner Bros. Discovery (through its International division). It is available on digital terrestrial television and free-to-air satellite provider Tivùsat.

History 

The channel launched on 20 November 2004 at 8:00 pm, after replacing VJ TV some months prior with a sign that said Boing, in arrivo. (Boing, coming soon.). In 2006 the channel rebranded to a new transparent screenbug and logo in promos, to follow the brand identity of Mediaset's other channels. The change included a new graphics package, introducing Animadz. Most of the Animadz lasted until August 2020. With the birth of Cartoonito in 2011, the channel increased its demographic to include 7–16-year olds. All preschool programs and blocks were moved to Cartoonito's schedule.

Boing rebranded to a new graphics package along with its Spanish and French versions developed by Lumbre on 7 March 2016, teased from the week prior. Most of the Animadz remained with a new look, however many were removed.

Programming

Current programming 
 Angels of Jarm
 Angelo Rules
 Arthur
 Batman: The Brave and the Bold
 Ben 10
 Camp Lazlo
 Codename: Kids Next Door
 Courage the Cowardly Dog
 Dexter's Laboratory
 DreamWorks Dragons
 Foster's Home for Imaginary Friends
 Green Lantern: The Animated Series
 Hi Hi Puffy AmiYumi
 Johnny Bravo
 Johnny Test
 My Gym Partner's a Monkey
 Sonic Boom
 The Garfield Show
 The Grim Adventures of Billy and Mandy
 The Life and Times of Juniper Lee
 The Powerpuff Girls
 ThunderCats
 Total Drama Island
 Yo-kai Watch
 Oggy And The Cockroaches
 Zig & Sharko

Former programming 

 Animaniacs 
 Freakazoid!
 Pinky and the Brain
 Police Academy
 Taz-Mania
 Tiny Toon Adventures
 Tom & Jerry Kids

Boing Plus 

Boing Plus launched on 11 July 2019 another channel, replacing Pop. This channel is a 1-hour timeshift feed of both Boing and Cartoonito, with Cartoonito's programming being shown from 4:00 am–1:00 pm and Boing's programming for the rest of the day. On 30 August 2020 Boing rebranded again to a new graphics package by Art&Graft, with only 2 Animadz remaining.

References

External links 
 Official site 

2004 establishments in Italy
2019 establishments in Italy
Boing (TV channel)
Children's television networks
Television channels in Italy
Italian-language television stations
Television channels and stations established in 2004
Television channels and stations established in 2019
Television stations in Malta
Mediaset
Mediaset television channels

Turner Broadcasting System Italy
Warner Bros. Discovery EMEA